B. Jayamma (15 November 1915 – 20 December 1988) was an Indian actress and singer. She began her career on stage as a 14-year-old when she joined a theatre group owned by Gubbi Veeranna, her future husband. She went on to perform for 45 years on stage while also appearing in 45 Kannada, Telugu and Tamil films.

Career 
Jayamma's first acting role in films came in 1931 in Raphael Algoet's directorial, His Love Affair. She starred as the lead in the film opposite Gubbi Veeranna, who also produced the film. Jayamma started in many silent films before appearing in talkies. A popular actor in the 1930s and 1940s, she featured in many films alongside her husband. In the Telugu film Swarga Seema (1945), she played Kalyani, a neglected homemaker. She played the eponymous role in the Kannada film Hemareddy Mallamma (1946) that dealt with the hardships faced by her character. Jayamma often playback-sang for her films too.

Filmography

Discography

References

Bibliography

External links 
 

1915 births
1988 deaths
People from Bangalore
Actresses from Bangalore
Kannada actresses
Indian film actresses
Actresses in Kannada cinema
Actresses in Telugu cinema
Actresses in Tamil cinema
20th-century Indian actresses
Recipients of the Sangeet Natak Akademi Award